Al Adm ( other transliterations include El Adem, Al `Adam, Al ‘Adam, Al `Adm, or Al ‘Aḑm) is a town in the Butnan District, of Libya. It is located roughly 22 kilometres south of the district's capital Tobruk.

The Gamal Abdul El Nasser Air Base, once known as Royal Air Force Station El Adem is located near this town.

Climate

References

Populated places in Butnan District